Steung Saen River (ស្ទឹងសែន), sometimes spelt Steung Sen, is a river in Cambodia. It is a major tributary of the Tonlé Sap.

The river passes through Preah Vihear Province and Kampong Thom Province. The northern extent of the river basin corresponds to the border with Thailand as in 1904, Siam and the French colonial authorities ruling Cambodia formed a joint commission to demarcate their mutual border to largely follow the watershed line of the Dângrêk mountain range.

Etymology

Steung Saen means "river of soldiers" in Khmer. Steung means river in Khmer, while Saen is derived from the Sanskrit word Sena (सेना), meaning "soldier".

References

External links

 Ramsar Sites Information Service:Stung Sen
 Stung Sen IWRM Integrated Water Resources Management

Rivers of Cambodia
Tonlé Sap